Gitler is a surname, and may refer to:

 Avi Gitler, Manhattan art dealer
 Haim Gitler (born 1962), Israeli curator and researcher
 Ira Gitler (1928–2019), American jazz historian and journalist
 Joseph Gitler, Leket Israel founder
 Samuel Gitler Hammer (1933–2014), Mexican mathematician

See also
 Brown–Gitler spectrum
 Gittler guitar
 Hitler (name)